Pavonia Yard is a Conrail Shared Assets Operations (CSAO) rail yard in Camden, New Jersey. 

The yard begins just north of where the Vineland Secondary tracks cross the Cooper River near the intersection of State and Federal Streets, and continues north until approximately 36th Street, ending near the 36th Street River Line station on the Bordentown Secondary.

History
It was built by the Pennsylvania Railroad (PRR) and opened in 1888. The yard was used to interchange with the West Jersey and Seashore Railroad (WJ&S) during 1896 to 1932, and with the Pennsylvania-Reading Seashore Lines (P-RSL) during 1932 to 1976. Initially the PRR operated large locomotive and car repair shops at the yard. In later years the engine work was discontinued, but the car repair shops remained in operation through the late 1930s. The yard was rebuilt in the 1960s.

Conrail
Pavonia Yard serves as CSAO's main classification yard for the Southern New Jersey area. It is a double-ended hump yard with a 32-track classification bowl. In 2009, Conrail Shared Assets significantly downgraded the yard, reflecting its changed status from a major hub to a regional classification center. Most of the hump's height was removed, and the tower was torn down, replaced with a "switching kiosk" which crews use manually to throw switches. Conrail builds two CSX and one Norfolk Southern train there every day. (Info from a Trains Magazine article on Conrail Shared Assets Operations)

See also
 List of New Jersey railroads
 List of New Jersey railroad junctions
 List of rail yards

References

External links

 Pavonia Yard Track Diagram as of 1975 (Penn Central Railroad)
 Pavonia Yard photos

Conrail
Pennsylvania Railroad
Pennsylvania-Reading Seashore Lines lines
Rail yards in New Jersey
Transportation in Camden, New Jersey
Transportation buildings and structures in Camden County, New Jersey